Byrsonima sericea is a species of semi-deciduous tree native to Brazil, Bolivia, Peru, Guyana, and French Guiana.

Description
The tree is medium-sized and usually grows 6–18 meters tall. Flowers are tall orange plumes which develop into small, 8 mm large fruits when mature.

Ecology
Prefers wet deciduous forests, either primary or secondary growth. Usually found in fertile soils by rivers or other small moving bodies of water.

Uses
The plant is used by Brazilians, to whom it is known as murici, to treat gastric injuries, due to the leaves' high content of flavonoids, such as rutin, isoquercitrin, kaempferol 3-O-rutinoside, and querceti, known for their antioxidant properties. It is also used for its tannins. 

The Byrosonima sericea additionally provides numerous health benefits to rodents. Among the floral oil benefits, also include the ability to decrease motility, including abnormal abdominal contractions and spasms, in mice. The antioxidant properties in the plant serve to provide gastroprotective and anti-diarrheal activities. The presence of these large amounts of phenolic compounds in the Byrosonima sericea such as flavonoids may possess antioxidant power as well, thus allowing benefits to the immune system as well; thus, the bioactivity of the phenolic compounds can be attributed to their ability to bond with certain metals, inhibit the which may be attributable for the antioxidant capacity. Additionally, the Byrosonima sericea can be used to treat the effects of fatty liver damage in rats. In a study done, the rats who had been treated with the extract from the plant showed less hepatic damage in their liver cells as in comparison with the negative control group rats. The study concluded that the rats treated with the floral oil from the Byrosonima sericea had additional hepatoprotective action from the enzyme secretion. (Wong, 2019)

References

Flenning, Rosa, et al. “Chemical Characterisation of the Floral Oil of the Nance (Byrsonima Sericea): Discovering the Constituents Used in Reproduction by Oil-Collecting Bees.” Web of Science, Database, Mar. 2020, Byrsonima sericea. 
Rodrigues, Patricia, et al. “Effect of Byrsonima Sericea DC. Leaf Extracts on Mice Gastrointestinal Tract.” Web of Science, 16 Oct. 2016, Byrsonima sericea. 
Wang, Yong, et al. “Protective Effect of Byrsonima Sericea Extract on Non-Alcoholic Fatty Liver Disease Model in Rats.” Web of Science, Sept. 2019, Byrsonima sericea.

sericea
Trees of South America